The women's time trial C1–3 road cycling event in cycling at the 2012 Summer Paralympics took place on 5 September at Brands Hatch. Nine riders from seven different nations competed.

Results

References

Women's road time trial C1-3
2012 in women's road cycling